Mercury(II) thiocyanate (Hg(SCN)2) is an inorganic chemical compound, the coordination complex of Hg2+ and the thiocyanate anion. It is a white powder.  It will produce a large, winding "snake" when ignited, an effect known as the Pharaoh's serpent.

Synthesis and structure
The first synthesis of mercury thiocyanate was probably completed in 1821 by Jöns Jacob Berzelius:
HgO + 2 HSCN  → Hg(SCN)2 + H2O

Evidence for the first pure sample was presented in 1866 prepared by a chemist named Otto Hermes. It is prepared by treating solutions containing mercury(II) and thiocyanate ions. The low solubility product of mercury thiocyanate causes it to precipitate from the solution. Most syntheses are achieved by precipitation:

Hg(NO3)2 + 2 KSCN  → Hg(SCN)2 + 2KNO3

The compound adopts a polymeric structure with Hg2+ centres linearly coordinated to two S atoms with a distance of 2.381 Å.  Four weak Hg2+--N interactions are indicated with distances of 2.81 Å.

Uses
Mercury thiocyanate has a few uses in chemical synthesis. It is the precursor to potassium tris(thiocyanato)mercurate(II) (K[Hg(SCN)3]) and caesium tris(thiocyanato)mercurate(II) (Cs[Hg(SCN)3]). The Hg(SCN)3− ion can also exist independently and is easily generated from the compounds above, amongst others.

Its reactions with organic halides yield two products, one with the sulfur bound to the organic compound and one with the nitrogen bound to the organic compound.

Use in chloride analysis
It was discovered that mercury thiocyanate can improve detection limits in the determination of chloride ions in water by UV-visible spectroscopy. This technique was first suggested in 1952 and has been a standard method for the determination of chloride ions in laboratories worldwide ever since. An automated system was invented in 1964 and then a commercial colour analyzer was made available in 1974 by Technicon (Tarrytown, NY, USA). The basic mechanism involves the addition of mercury thiocyanate to a solution with an unknown concentration of chloride ions and iron as a reagent. The chloride ions cause the mercury thiocyanate salt to dissociate and the thiocyanate ion to bind Fe(III), which absorbs intensely at 450  nm. This absorption allows for the measurement of the concentration of the iron complex. This value allows one to calculate the concentration of chloride.

It can determine the concentration of chloride ions in an aqueous solution. Mercury thiocyanate without iron (III) is added to a solution with an unknown concentration of chloride ions, forming a complex of the mercury thiocyanate and chloride ion that absorbs light at a  254  nm, allowing more accurate measurements of attention than the aforementioned technique using the iron.

Pharaoh's serpent

Mercury thiocyanate was formerly used in pyrotechnics causing an effect known as the Pharaoh's serpent or Pharaoh's snake. When the compound is in the presence of a strong enough heat source, a rapid, exothermic reaction that produces a large mass of coiling, serpent-like solid is started.  An inconspicuous flame, which is often blue but can also be yellow/orange, accompanies the combustion. The resulting solid can range from dark graphite gray to light tan in colour with the inside generally much darker than the outside.

The reaction has several stages as follows:  Igniting mercury thiocyanate causes it to form an insoluble brown mass that is primarily carbon nitride, C3N4. Mercury sulfide and carbon disulfide are also produced.

References

External links
"Pharaoh's snake". YouTube. September 2, 2008.
"How to make the Pharaoh's Serpent (Mercury (II) Thiocyanate)". YouTube. March 24, 2014

Thiocyanates
Mercury(II) compounds